We Walk The Line: A Celebration of the Music of Johnny Cash is a live tribute album to country musician, Johnny Cash. The album features various interpretations of Cash's hits and songs he had covered on his American Recordings albums. The concert presented artists from a wide variety of genres and were backed by an all-star band led by Grammy Award-winning producer and musical director Don Was, country songwriter and musician Buddy Miller, drummer Kenny Aronoff, keyboardist Ian McLagan, and multi-instrumentalist Greg Leisz. The profits from the ticket sales and album release will benefit "Charley's Fund", a non-profit organization that works to find a cure for the fatal childhood disease Duchenne muscular dystrophy.

Track listing

Note: The songs are credited as they appear in the liner notes.

DVD sequencing and features
The concert itself is sequenced differently than the album and features band and song introductions by Matthew McConaughey.

Bonus features include a rehearsal performance of "I Still Miss Someone" by Willie Nelson, a performance of "The Man Comes Around" by McConaughey, a featurette titled "Johnny Cash, His Life and Music" (featuring interviews from the ensemble), and "Walk the Line: The Making of a Celebration", a behind the scenes look on how the concert was conceived.

Chart performance

References

Country albums by American artists
Johnny Cash tribute albums
2012 live albums
2012 video albums
Live video albums
Live country music albums
Country music video albums
Live folk rock albums
Folk rock video albums
Folk rock albums by American artists
Charity albums
Legacy Recordings video albums
Legacy Recordings live albums